The 1985 New Zealand Grand Prix was a race held at the Pukekohe Park Raceway on 16 December 1984. It was the 31st running of the New Zealand Grand Prix and was won by American Ross Cheever. The podium was completed by New Zealander Ken Smith and fellow American Jeff MacPherson.

Classification

Qualifying

Race

References

Grand Prix
New Zealand Grand Prix
January 1985 sports events in New Zealand